Genetic studies on the Sinhalese is part of population genetics investigating the origins of the Sinhalese population.

Genetic studies on the Sinhalese suggest a high degree of genetic closeness between the Sinhalese and Bengalis, followed by the Tamils and a minor North West Indian (Gujarati and Punjabi) contribution.

Relationship to Bengalis

An Alu polymorphism analysis by Mastana S (2007) using Sinhalese, Tamil, Bengali, Gujarati (Patel), and Punjabi as parental populations found the following proportions of genetic contribution:

Analysis of X chromosome STRs by Perera et al. (2021) found the Sinhalese to be more closely related to Bengalis, than the Indian Tamil population.

Genetic distance analysis by Kirk (1976) found the Sinhalese to be closer to the Bengal than they are to populations in Gujarat or the Panjab.

D1S80 allele frequency (a popular allele for genetic fingerprinting) is also similar between the Sinhalese and Bengalis, suggesting the two groups are closely related.

The Sinhalese also have similar frequencies of the allele MTHFR 677T (13%) to West Bengalis (17%).

Relationship to Indian Tamils

A genetic admixture study by Kshatriya (1995) found the Sinhalese to have a higher contribution from Indian Tamils (69.86% +/- 0.61), compared with the Bengalis (25.41% +/- 0.51).

Genetic distance analysis by Roychoudhury AK et al. (1985) suggested the Sinhalese are more closely related to South and West Indian populations, than the Bengalis.

Genetic distance analysis by Kirk (1976) suggested the Sinhalese are closer to the Tamils and Keralites of South India, than they are to the populations in Gujarat or the Panjab.

Relationship to North West Indians 
An Alu polymorphism analysis by Mastana S (2007) found a minor North West Indian contribution (20-23%).

HLA analysis by Malavige et al. (2007) found similar frequencies of the allele HLA-A*02 in sinhalese (7.4%) and North Indian subjects (6.7%). HLA-A*02 is a rare allele which has a relatively high frequency in North Indian populations and is considered to be a novel allele among the North Indian population. This suggests possible North Indian origin of the Sinhalese.

Analysis of X chromosome STRs by Perera et al., (2011) showed that the Sinhalese, Sri Lankan Tamil, Moor and Indian Tamils of Sri Lanka, share affinities with the Bhil (an Indigenous group) of North West India.

Relationship to other major ethnic groups in Sri Lanka
A study looking at genetic variation of the FUT2 gene in the Sinhalese and Sri Lankan Tamil population, found similar genetic backgrounds for both ethnic groups, with little genetic flow from other neighbouring Asian population groups. Studies have also found no significant difference with regards to blood group, blood genetic markers (Saha, 1988) and single-nucleotide polymorphism between the Sinhalese and other ethnic groups in Sri Lanka. Another study has also found "no significant genetic variation among the major ethnic groups in Sri Lanka". This is further supported by a study which found very similar frequencies of alleles MTHFR 677T, F2 20210A & F5 1691A in Indian Tamil, Sinhalese, Sri Lankan Tamil, and Sri Lankan Moor populations.

Relationship to East and Southeast Asians
Genetic studies show that the Sinhalese have received some genetic flow from neighboring populations in East Asia and Southeast Asia, such as from the ethnically diverse and disparate Tibeto-Burman peoples and Austro-Asiatic peoples, which is due to their close genetic links to Northeast India. A 1985 study conducted by Roychoudhury AK and Nei M, indicated the values of genetic distance showed that the Sinhalese people were slightly closer to Mongoloid populations due to gene exchange in the past. In regards to comparisons of root and canal morphology of Sri Lankan mandibular molars, it showed that they were further away from Mongoloid populations. Among haplogroups found in East Asian populations, a lower frequency of East Asian mtDNA haplogroup, G has been found among the populations of Sri Lanka alongside haplogroup D in conjunction with the main mtDNA haplogroup of Sri Lanka's ethnic groups, haplogroup M. In regards to Y-DNA, Haplogroup C-M130 is found at low to moderate frequencies in Sri Lanka.

Genetic markers of immunoglobulin among the Sinhalese show high frequencies of afb1b3 which has its origins in the Yunnan and Guangxi provinces of southern China. It is also found at high frequencies among Odias, certain Nepali and Northeast Indian, southern Han Chinese, Southeast Asian and certain Austronesian populations of the Pacific Islands. At a lower frequency, ab3st is also found among the Sinhalese and is generally found at higher frequencies among northern Han Chinese, Tibetan, Mongolian, Korean and Japanese populations. The Transferrin TF*Dchi allele which is common among East Asian and Native American populations is also found among the Sinhalese. HumDN1*4 and HumDN1*5 are the predominant DNase I genes among the Sinhalese and are also the predominant genes among southern Chinese ethnic groups and the Tamang people of Nepal. A 1988 study conducted by N. Saha, showed the high GC*1F and low GC*1S frequencies among the Sinhalese are comparable to those of the Chinese, Japanese, Koreans, Thais, Malays, Vietnamese, Laotians and Tibetans. A 1998 study conducted by D.E. Hawkey showed dental morphology of the Sinhalese is closely related to those of the Austro-Asiatic populations of East and Northeast India. Hemoglobin E a variant of normal hemoglobin, which originated in and is prevalent among populations in Southeast Asia, is also common among the Sinhalese and can reach up to 40% in Sri Lanka.

Paternal Line

Y-DNA of Sinhalese

The most common Y-chromosome DNA haplogroups found in the Sinhalese are Haplogroup R2, Haplogroup R1a and Haplogroup L.

Maternal Line

MtDNA of Sinhalese

Ranweera et al. (2014) found the most common mtDNA haplogroup in the Sinhalese to be Haplogroup M, Haplogroup U (U7a) and Haplogroup R(R30b) and Haplogroup G (G3a1′2).

Haplogroup M represents the dispersal of modern humans around 60.000 years ago along the southern Asian coastline following a southern coastal route across Arabia and India to reach Australia short after.

Haplogroup U7 is considered a West Eurasian–specific mtDNA haplogroup, believed to have originated in the Black Sea area approximately 30,000 years ago. In South Asia, U7 occurs in about 12% in Gujarat, while for the whole of India its frequency stays around 2%, and 5% in Pakistan. In the Vedda people of Sri Lanka it reaches its highest frequency of 13.33% (subclade U7a). It is speculated that large-scale immigration carried these mitochondrial haplogroups into India.

References 

Sinhalese
Sinhalese
Sinhalese
Indo-Aryan peoples
Sinhalese people